Cardwell is a census-designated place (CDP) in Jefferson County, Montana, United States. The population was 50 at the 2010 census. It is part of the Helena Micropolitan Statistical Area.

The town was named for area rancher and state senator Edward Cardwell.

Geography
Cardwell is located in southern Jefferson County at  (45.864890, -111.959007), in the valley of the Jefferson River, which forms the southern boundary of the community as well as the Madison County line. Interstate 90 forms the northern edge of the community, with access from Exit 256 (Montana Highway 359). I-90 leads east  to Bozeman and west  to Butte.

Climate
According to the Köppen Climate Classification system, Cardwell has a semi-arid climate, abbreviated "BSk" on climate maps.

Demographics

As of the census of 2000, there were 40 people, 19 households, and 9 families residing in the CDP. The population density was 17.5 people per square mile (6.8/km2). There were 19 housing units at an average density of 8.3 per square mile (3.2/km2). The racial makeup of the CDP was 97.50% White, 2.50% from other races. Hispanic or Latino of any race were 2.50% of the population.

There were 19 households, out of which 10.5% had children under the age of 18 living with them, 42.1% were married couples living together, 5.3% had a female householder with no husband present, and 52.6% were non-families. 42.1% of all households were made up of individuals, and 15.8% had someone living alone who was 65 years of age or older. The average household size was 2.11 and the average family size was 2.67.

In the CDP, the population was spread out, with 22.5% under the age of 18, 2.5% from 18 to 24, 27.5% from 25 to 44, 32.5% from 45 to 64, and 15.0% who were 65 years of age or older. The median age was 44 years. For every 100 females, there were 81.8 males. For every 100 females age 18 and over, there were 106.7 males.

The median income for a household in the CDP was $21,250, and the median income for a family was $23,750. Males had a median income of $23,750 versus $0 for females. The per capita income for the CDP was $9,716. There were no families and 9.7% of the population living below the poverty line, including no under eighteens and 60.0% of those over 64.

Notable person
Prominent American newscaster Chet Huntley was born in Cardwell in 1911.

See also

 List of census-designated places in Montana

References

External links

Census-designated places in Montana
Census-designated places in Jefferson County, Montana
Helena, Montana micropolitan area